Bus monitoring is a term used in flight testing when capturing data from avionics buses and networks in data acquisition telemetry systems. Commonly monitored avionics buses include  
 ARINC Standard buses such as ARINC-429, ARINC 573, ARINC 717
 ARINC 629 also known as Multi-transmitter Data Bus
 ARINC 664 also known as Deterministic Ethernet
 ARINC 825 Controller Area Network (CAN)
 Common Airborne Instrumentation Systems (CAIS)
 Cross Channel Data Link (CCDL) / Motor Controller Data Link (MCDL)
 Ethernet
 Fibre Channel
 Firewire, IEEE 1394
 IRIG-106 PCM
 MIL-STD-1553
 RS-232/RS-422/RS-485
 STANAG-3910
 Time-Triggered Protocol (TTP)

Typically a bus monitor must listen-only on the bus and intercept a copy of the messages on the bus. In general a bus monitor never transmits on the monitored bus. Once the bus monitor has intercepted a message, the message is made available to the rest of the data acquisition system for subsequent recording and/or analysis.

There are three classes of bus monitor: 
 Parser bus monitor
 Snarfer bus monitor
 Packetizer bus monitor

Parser bus monitor 
Parser bus monitoring is also known as coherent monitoring or IRIG-106 Chapter 4 monitoring. Parser bus monitors are suited to applications where the bus is highly active and only a few specific parameters of interest must be extracted.

The parser bus monitor uses protocol tracking to identify and classify messages on the bus. From the identified messages of interest, specific parameters can be extracted from the captured messages. In order to ensure that coherency is achieved whereby all extracted parameters are from the same message instance, the parameters must be triple buffered with stale and skipped indicators. Optionally time tags can be added to each parsed message.

Snarfer bus monitor 
Snarfer bus monitoring is also known as FIFO or IRIG-106 Chapter 8 monitoring. Snarfer bus monitors are suited to applications where all messages and traffic on the bus must be captured for processing, analysis, and recording.

A snarfer bus monitor captures all messages on the bus, tags them with a timestamp and content identifiers (for example Command or Status in the case of MIL-STD-1553 buses), and puts them into a FIFO.

Packetizer bus monitor 
Packetizer bus monitors are designed for networked data acquisition systems where the acquired data from the avionics buses is captured and re-packetized in Ethernet frames for transmission to an analysis computer or network recorder. 
The packetizer bus monitor captures selected messages of interest (parsed) or all messages on the bus (snarfed) and packages the message in the payload of a UDP/IP packet. The application layer contains bus identifiers, sequence numbers and timestamps. The most popular application layer protocols used for networked data acquisition systems include the Airbus IENA format and the iNET (integrated Network Enhanced Telemetry) TmNS (Telemetry Network System) format.

References

External links 
 IRIG
 XidML
 ETEP - Airborne Data acquisition systems
 Curtiss-Wright Controls Avionics & Electronics
 iNET
 Ballard Technology Aircraft Interface Devices with monitoring capabilities

Data collection